(released as Cheeky in English) is a 2000 sex comedy directed by Tinto Brass, with Yuliya Mayarchuk in the lead role. Certain parallelisms are drawn between Nerosubianco (1969), another Tinto Brass film set in London.

Plot
In London, the beautiful Venetian Carla Burin (Yuliya Mayarchuk) is an intern at the front desk of a hotel. She is looking for an apartment to allow her boyfriend Matteo (Jarno Berardi) to join her there. The real estate agent, Moira (Francesca Nunzi), who is bisexual, rents her a loft with a view of the Thames, with "intimate conditions." When the hot-tempered, jealous Matteo finds a nude picture of Carla and letters from her French ex-lover Bernard (Mauro Lorenz), Carla and Matteo have a row on the telephone. Angry at Matteo, Carla sleeps with Moira. Matteo, desperate, comes to London, where he finds Moira naked in Carla's apartment. He confronts Carla about all her past infidelities and refuses her offer to perform fellatio on him before leaving. After a walk in the park, where he observes much sexual activity, he changes his mind. Carla shows up with a written account of her infidelities, but Matteo declares he no longer needs to know.

Production
Yuliya Mayarchuk revealed that the two most difficult scenes for her were the one in which she has sex in a gondola (she had to put a fake penis inside her vagina and she started crying) and the infamous anal sex scene on a beach with Mauro Lorenz. "I didn't sleep the whole night before," Mayarchuk recalled.

Reception
In a retrospective review, Sight & Sound described the film as a "corny soft-porn flick" and predominantly useful as "a chance to ogle plenty of pert bottoms, or 'windows to the soul' according to self-satisfied director Tinto Brass in the accompanying interview."

Notes

External links

 

2000 films
2000s sex comedy films
Films directed by Tinto Brass
2000s Italian-language films
Films set in London
Commedia sexy all'italiana
Films scored by Pino Donaggio
Italian sex comedy films
2000 comedy films
2000s Italian films